Sergei Zamorski (born 22 January 1971) is a retired footballer from Estonia who also holds Russian nationality. He retired in 2004. His last club was JK Trans Narva.

International career
Zamorski obtained a total number of four caps for the Estonia national football team in 1993. He scored the first goal on 4 July 1993 when Estonia defeated Lithuania in the Pärnu Kalevi Stadium during the Baltic Cup 1993.

References
 Estonian Topscorers

1971 births
Living people
Sportspeople from Narva
Estonian footballers
Estonia international footballers
Association football midfielders
Estonian people of Russian descent
JK Narva Trans players
Estonian expatriate footballers
Estonian expatriate sportspeople in Finland
Expatriate footballers in Finland